Michael J. Kinane (born 22 June 1959, Killenaule, County Tipperary) is an Irish former flat racing jockey. He had a 34-year career, retiring on 8 December 2009.

A prolific winner of the Irish, English and French Classic races over two decades, Kinane has ridden winners in the 2,000 Guineas four times, The Derby three times, the Melbourne Cup in Australia and, in the United States, the Belmont Stakes once. Kinane also has four wins in Breeders' Cup races. He has been Irish Champion Jockey on 13 occasions.

He first came to prominence as the stable jockey to Liam Browne winning the 1982 Irish 2000 Guineas and St James Palace Stakes at Ascot, both on Dara Monarch, and finishing 2nd in the 1983 Epsom Derby on Carlingford Castle, before moving to Dermot Weld. He was later retained by John Magnier and Aidan O'Brien as stable jockey at Ballydoyle for many years prior to joining leading Irish flat trainer John Oxx. He became one of the world's elite jockeys and excelled on the big occasions at Longchamp and Epsom, and was regarded as one of the leading professionals of his sport.

He retired at the end of 2009, a season which was highlighted by his association with Sea The Stars. He bred the 2007 Epsom Derby winner Authorized.

post-jockey career 
Michael Kinane is current working for Hong Kong Jockey Club in Europe to select horses who suit run for Hong Kong. Those horses are re-saled by Hong Kong Jockey Club in an auction.

Major wins
Great Britain
 2,000 Guineas – (4) – Tirol (1990), Entrepreneur (1997), King of Kings (1998), Sea the Stars (2009)
 Ascot Gold Cup – (3) – Classic Cliche (1996), Kayf Tara (2000), Yeats (2007)
 Champion Stakes – (1) – Pilsudski (1997)
 Cheveley Park Stakes – (2) – Blue Duster (1995), Donna Blini (2005)
 Coronation Cup – (1) – Scorpion (2007)
 Coronation Stakes – (2) – Kissing Cousin (1994), Sophisticat (2002)
 Derby – (3) – Commander in Chief (1993), Galileo (2001), Sea the Stars (2009)
 Dewhurst Stakes – (1) – Rock of Gibraltar (2001)
 Eclipse Stakes – (4) – Opera House (1993), Pilsudski (1997), Hawk Wing (2002), Sea the Stars (2009)
 Falmouth Stakes – (1) – Sensation (1996)
 Fillies' Mile – (2) – Reams of Verse (1996), Sunspangled (1998)
 Golden Jubilee Stakes – (2) – Big Shuffle (1987), Cape of Good Hope (2005)
 International Stakes – (3) – Giant's Causeway (2000), Electrocutionist (2005), Sea the Stars (2009)
 July Cup – (2) – Stravinsky (1999), Mozart (2001)
 King George VI and Queen Elizabeth Stakes – (5) – Belmez (1990), King's Theatre (1994), Montjeu (2000), Galileo (2001), Azamour (2005)
 Lockinge Stakes – (1) – Hawk Wing (2003)
 Middle Park Stakes – (2) – Minardi (2000), Johannesburg (2001)
 Nunthorpe Stakes – (2) – Stravinsky (1999), Mozart (2001)
 Oaks – (2) – Shahtoush (1998), Imagine (2001)
 Prince of Wales's Stakes – (2) – Lear Spear (1999), Azamour (2005)
 Queen Anne Stakes – (3) – Alflora (1993), Barathea (1994), Charnwood Forest (1996)
 Queen Elizabeth II Stakes – (1) – George Washington (2006)
 Racing Post Trophy – (1) – Saratoga Springs (1997)
 St. James's Palace Stakes – (6) – Dara Monarch (1982), Brief Truce (1992), Grand Lodge (1994), Giant's Causeway (2000), Rock of Gibraltar (2002), Azamour (2004)
 St. Leger Stakes – (1) – Milan (2001)
 Sussex Stakes – (4) – Among Men (1998), Giant's Causeway (2000), Rock of Gibraltar (2002), Proclamation (2005)
 Yorkshire Oaks – (1) – Alexandrova (2006)

Ireland
 Irish 1,000 Guineas – (3) – Trusted Partner (1988), Yesterday (2003), Saoire (2005)
 Irish 2,000 Guineas – (3) – Dara Monarch (1982), Flash of Steel (1986), Rock of Gibraltar (2002)
 Irish Champion Stakes – (7) – Carroll House (1989), Cézanne (1994), Pilsudski (1997), Giant's Causeway (2000), High Chaparral (2003), Azamour (2004), Sea the Stars (2009)
 Irish Derby – (2) – Galileo (2001), High Chaparral (2002)
 Irish Oaks – (2) – Alydaress (1989), Dance Design (1996)
 Irish St. Leger – (4) – Vintage Crop (1993, 1994), Kastoria (2006), Alandi (2009)
 Matron Stakes – (2) – Eternal Reve (1994), Clerio (1997)
 Moyglare Stud Stakes – (3) – Flutter Away (1987), Quarter Moon (2001), Necklace (2003)
 National Stakes – (4) – Definite Article (1994), Mus-If (1998), Hawk Wing (2001), One Cool Cat (2003)
 Phoenix Stakes – (5) – King Persian (1983), Fasliyev (1999), Minardi (2000), Johannesburg (2001), One Cool Cat (2003)
 Pretty Polly Stakes – (3) – Market Booster (1992), Dance Design (1996, 1997)
 Tattersalls Gold Cup – (6) – Cockney Lass (1987), Prince of Andros (1995), Definite Article (1996), Dance Design (1997), Montjeu (2000), Black Sam Bellamy (2003)

Australia
 Melbourne Cup – (1) – Vintage Crop (1993)

Canada
 Canadian International – (1) – Ballingarry (2002)

France
 Critérium de Saint-Cloud – (1) – Alberto Giacometti (2002)
 Poule d'Essai des Poulains – (1) – Landseer (2002)
 Poule d'Essai des Pouliches – (1) – Rose Gypsy (2001)
 Prix de l'Abbaye de Longchamp – (1) – Committed (1985)
 Prix de l'Arc de Triomphe – (3) – Carroll House (1989), Montjeu (1999), Sea the Stars (2009)
 Prix du Cadran – (1) – Alandi (2009)
 Prix de la Forêt – (1) – Somnus (2004)
 Prix Jean-Luc Lagardère – (3) – Second Empire (1997), Ciro (1999), Rock of Gibraltar (2001)
 Prix Lupin – (1) – Ciro (2000)
 Prix Maurice de Gheest – (1) – Pursuit of Love (1992)
 Prix Morny – (3) – Orpen (1998), Fasliyev (1999), Johannesburg (2001)
 Prix du Moulin de Longchamp – (1) – Rock of Gibraltar (2002)
 Prix de la Salamandre – (1) – Giant's Causeway (1999)
 Prix Vermeille – (1) – Volvoreta (2000)

Germany
 Aral-Pokal – (3) – Tel Quel (1992), Monsun (1993), Luso (1996)
 Bayerisches Zuchtrennen – (1) – Market Booster (1993)

Hong Kong
 Champions Mile – (1) – Able One (2007)
 Hong Kong Mile – (2) – Additional Risk (1991), Winning Partners (1993)
 Hong Kong Champions & Chater Cup – (2) – Viva Pataca (2006, 2007)
 Hong Kong Cup – (1) – Precision (2002)
 Hong Kong Derby – (2) – Sound Print (1992), Che Sara Sara (1996)
 Hong Kong Gold Cup – (1) – Idol (2001)
 Hong Kong Vase – (1) – Luso (1997)
 Stewards' Cup – (1) – Sound Print (1992)
 Queen Elizabeth II Cup – (3) – Deerfield (1994), Red Bishop (1995), Viva Pataca (2007)

India
 Indian 1000 Guineas – (1) – Nauvkhal (1986)
 Indian 2000 Guineas – (2) – Eversun (1984), Sir Bruce (1985) 
 Indian Derby – (3) – Sir Bruce (1986), Cordon Bleu (1988), HotStepper (2008)
 Indian Oaks – (3) – Revelation (1985), Silver Haven (1986), Golden Treasure (1990)
 Calcutta 1000 Guineas – (1) – Wheels (1983)
 Golconda Derby – (1) – Deccan Star (1984)

Italy
 Derby Italiano – (2) – In a Tiff (1992), Luso (1995)
 Gran Criterium – (2) – Sholokhov (2001), Spartacus (2002)
 Gran Premio del Jockey Club – (1) – Black Sam Bellamy (2002)
 Premio Parioli – (2) – Again Tomorrow (1985), Gay Burslem (1988)
 Premio Roma – (1) – Welsh Guide (1988)

Japan
 Japan Cup – (1) – Pilsudski (1997)
 Hanshin Juvenile Fillies – (1) – Yamakatsu Suzuran (1999)

Slovakia
 Slovenské Derby – (1) – Temirkanov (1998)

United States
 Belmont Stakes – (1) – Go And Go (1990)
 Breeders' Cup Juvenile – (1) – Johannesburg (2001)
 Breeders' Cup Turf – (2) – High Chaparral (2002, 2003 dead-heat)
 Secretariat Stakes – (1) – Ciro (2000)

Personal life
His father, Tommy Kinane, was a leading National Hunt jockey who won the Champion Hurdle on Monksfield.

See also
 List of jockeys

References

External links
 Mick Kinane Official Website
Photo of Mick Kinane after winning the Investec Derby in June 2009, courtesy of George Bladon/nrgsportspix.com

1959 births
Living people
Sportspeople from County Tipperary
Irish jockeys
Lester Award winners